Aleksandar Mutavdžić (Serbian Cyrillic: Александар Мутавџић; born 3 January 1977) is a Serbian footballer who played as a left midfielder.

He has played for FK Rad, K.A.A. Gent, Standard Liège, G. Beerschot, CSKA Sofia and Cercle Brugge.

Career
Mutavdžić started his career in FK Rad before moving to Belgium.

Mutavdžić played 2 games for Germinal Beerschot at the start of 2002-03 season before signed by Standard Liège. But a knee injury made his season came to early end in January 2003. He came out from injury in January 2004. But in 2004-05 season he was excluded in first team although played twice in UEFA Cup.

In January 2006, he was signed for PFC CSKA Sofia along with countryman Oliver Kovačević. he was released at the end of season and moved to Cercle Brugge.

Personal life
Mutavdžić also holds Belgian nationality.

References

External links

vi.nl

1977 births
Living people
Serbian footballers
Serbian expatriate footballers
FK Rad players
Beerschot A.C. players
Standard Liège players
PFC CSKA Sofia players
Cercle Brugge K.S.V. players
K.A.A. Gent players
Panserraikos F.C. players
Belgian Pro League players
First Professional Football League (Bulgaria) players
Expatriate footballers in Belgium
Expatriate footballers in Bulgaria
Expatriate footballers in Greece
Association football midfielders
Serbian emigrants to Belgium
Naturalised citizens of Belgium
Serbian expatriate sportspeople in Bulgaria